Yatsushiro-gū (八代宮, Yatsushiro-gū) is a Shinto shrine located in Yatsushiro, Kumamoto  Prefecture, Japan. Its main festival is held annually on August 3. It was founded in 1884, and enshrines the kami of Prince Kaneyoshi. It is one of the Fifteen Shrines of the Kenmu Restoration.

In the former Modern system of ranked Shinto Shrines, it was an imperial shrine of the second rank (官幣中社, Kanpei-chūsha).

See also
Fifteen Shrines of the Kenmu Restoration

External links
Official website

Shinto shrines in Kumamoto Prefecture
1884 establishments in Japan

Beppyo shrines